C.I.D. is a 1990 Indian Hindi action film directed by Ajay Goel. The film stars Vinod Khanna, Amrita Singh, Juhi Chawla, Suresh Oberoi, Shafi Inamdar, Aloknath and Kiran Kumar.

Plot
C.I.D. Inspector Veer Sehgal (Vinod Khanna) wages war against organized crime. His enemy is Roshan Lala (Kiran Kumar), the overlord of the drug and gold smuggling racket in India. So dangerous a man is Roshan Lala that no witness has ever dared to come forward to give evidence against him in court. Frustrated by the lack of evidence and witness needed to convict Roshan Lala, Inspector Veer manages to have a young undercover officer Raksha Mehra (Juhi Chawla) infiltrate Roshan Lala's organization. However, she is soon discovered to be a Police officer and ruthlessly shot down by Roshan in a deserted street. Fatefully, this murder is witnessed by Mr & Mrs Saxena, a respectable middle-aged couple whose only daughter Meghna Saxena (Amrita Singh) is engaged to be married to Inspector Veer. Will Roshan Lala be successful in his design? Does Inspector Veer convict Roshan Lala, or does he lose his beloved forever?

Cast
Vinod Khanna as CID Inspector Veer Sehgal
Amrita Singh as Meghna Saxena
Juhi Chawla as CID Inspector Raksha Mehra
Suresh Oberoi as Major Brijmohan Verma
Kiran Kumar as Roshan Lala
Aloknath as IGP Kumar
Shafi Inamdar as Inspector Faizan
Aftab Shivdasani as Sunny 
Bharat Kapoor as Sunil Saxena
Aparajita as Sudha Saxena
Sudhir as Micheal

Soundtrack
The Music is scored by Kalyanji-Anandji. Lyrics are penned by Anjaan and Ramesh Pant. The playback singers are Kishore Kumar, Amit Kumar, Kumar Sanu, Alka Yagnik, Alisha Chinai and Jolly Mukherjee.

External links 
 

1990s Hindi-language films
1990 films
Films scored by Kalyanji Anandji
Fictional portrayals of police departments in India